Rune Andersson (28 April 1919 – 27 August 1992) was a Swedish sports shooter. He competed in the trap event at the 1960 Summer Olympics.

References

External links
 

1919 births
1992 deaths
Swedish male sport shooters
Olympic shooters of Sweden
Shooters at the 1960 Summer Olympics
Sportspeople from Västra Götaland County